FC Cape Town was a South African football club based in the Parow suburb of Cape Town.

The club was founded in 2006 when it was agreed to purchase the franchise license of Vasco da Gama. It was dissolved in 2017 when the franchise license was sold to Ubuntu Cape Town FC.

History

Post-sale 
Following the club's license sale to Ubuntu Cape Town, the club's management continued to operate a global advisory and legal services firm known as FC Cape Town Consulting.

FC Cape Town Consulting operates with football clients across the globe and is active in the following areas in terms of the FIFA Regulations: Umbro kit Supply (exclusivity in Africa), training and development compensation, solidarity payment mechanisms, legal services for overdue payables, legal services for contractual disputes, legal services for transfer disputes, legal services for club/coach/player disputes, player risk assessments, compliance services, intermediary services, regulations and Internal constitutions, sponsorship acquisition, sports marketing, representation before FIFA and CAS as well as anti doping.

References

External links
 
Premier Soccer League
NFD Club Info

2006 establishments in South Africa
2017 disestablishments in South Africa
Association football clubs established in 2006
Defunct soccer clubs in South Africa
National First Division clubs
Soccer clubs in Cape Town
Association football clubs disestablished in 2017